123 is a 2002 Indian Tamil-language romantic comedy film directed by K. Subash. It was partially reshot in Kannada and Telugu. The film stars real-life brothers Prabhu Deva, Raju Sundaram, and Nagendra Prasad alongside Jyothika as the main female lead, while Deva composed the film's music. Based on the Marathi play All The Best by Devendra Pem, 123 was released in June 2002.

Plot 
Tirupathi, Pazhani and Chidambaram are physically impaired friends – Thirupathi is blind, Pazhani is deaf, and Chidambaram is mute. None of them has a family, and they begin to live under the same roof. Narmada enters their lives, and all three fall in love with her. The story follows their attempts to win her hand.

Cast

Production 
In December 2001, the three sons of prominent dance choreographer Mugur Sundar were reported to be coming together to star in the Tamil film, and while Prabhu Deva was an established actor and Raju Sundaram had also appeared in films, it became the first substantial role for Nagendra Prasad. Karunas was selected to play a key role, while Sundaram was reported to be a choreographer in the film, which would be based on the Marathi play All the Best by Devendra Pem. The mouth freshener brand, Pass Pass, teamed up with the film to put product placement into the venture. The film was released in Kannada under the supervision of Sundeep Malani.

Release and reception 
Tamil version
The Tamil version of the film opened on 1 June 2002. A critic from BizHat.com noted, "Dilshad as the blind Tirupathy has done his role well but Raju Sundaram and Nagendra Prasad have to pick up the nuances of acting. Jyothika has very little to do. The comedy of Karnas is good. However, the highlight of the film are the dances and the choreography. The three brothers have tried to outbeat each other when it comes to dancing. Music by Deva is very average". Malathi Rangarajan of The Hindu noted "it is a tightrope walk for director K. Subhash because presenting physical impairment without hurting sentiments is not easy. And the director does come out unscathed. Much of it is situational humour and the dialogue, again by Subhash, accentuates the comic impact in some of the scenes". Visual Dasan of Kalki called the film a torture.

Telugu version
The Telugu version of the film released on the same day. Jeevi of Idlebrain.com gave the film two stars, stating "The only strength of the film is situation comedy based on the disabilities of three protagonists. Otherwise it's an avoidable film". Gudipoodi Srihari of The Hindu cited "The film keeps grip on the audience, because of the curiosity the subject kicks up, regarding the survival of the handicapped using their sixth sense. The characters are difficult to portray, but the three main artistes do it convincingly".

Soundtrack 
The soundtrack was composed by Deva. Sandeep Chowta was initially expected to be the film's composer. Tamil lyrics were written by Thamarai, Kalaikumar and Victor.

References

External links 
 

2000s Tamil-language films
2002 films
2002 multilingual films
2002 romantic comedy films
Films about disability in India
Films directed by K. Subash
Films scored by Deva (composer)
Films set in Bangalore
Indian films based on plays
Indian multilingual films
Indian romantic comedy films